5-HO-DiPT (5-hydroxy-N,N-di-iso-propyltryptamine) is a tryptamine derivative which acts as a serotonin receptor agonist. It is primarily known as a metabolite of the better known psychoactive drug 5-MeO-DiPT, but 5-HO-DiPT has also rarely been encountered as a designer drug in its own right. Tests in vitro show 5-HO-DiPT to have high 5-HT2A affinity and good selectivity over 5-HT1A, while being more lipophilic than the related drug bufotenine (5-HO-DMT), which produces mainly peripheral effects.

See also 
 alpha-Methylserotonin
 4-HO-DiPT
 4-HO-DSBT
 5-AcO-DMT

References 

Tryptamines
Diisopropylamino compounds